Paulo Centurion (born 8 December 1982) is an Argentine professional footballer who most recently played as a defender for Guatemalan club Comunicaciones FC.

Centurión, son of retired international soccer player Cristino Centurión, has played in Argentina, Paraguay, Guatemala and Puerto Rico.

Career

Early career 
Paulo Centurión made his debut in his native province of Formosa in 2002 at Club Sol de América in the first division of the regional Liga Formoseña de Fútbol,  In 2003, he moved to Club Defensa y Justicia, also in Formosa.

He later joined Club Guaraní of Paraguay and debuted as a professional player on 29 August 2004, against Club Nacional. He scored his first goal on 16 April 2006 against Club Fernando de la Mora.

Comunicaciones 

In June 2006, Comunicaciones FC of Liga Nacional de Guatemala signed Centurión on a one-year loan with an option to purchase. He made his official debut for the team on 30 July against Deportivo Suchitepequez in a 2–1 home loss.

The club finished first in the Apertura 2006 league tournament and clinched automatic qualification to the semi-finals, where they faced Deportivo Jalapa over two matches. In the first match at Jalapa on 7 December they won 2–1, and in the second match at home on 10 December they won 3–1 (5–2 aggregate). Comunicaciones advanced to the final where they faced their archrival, C.S.D. Municipal. The first match on 14 July was an away game resulting in a 0–0 draw, and the second match at home resulted in a 1–1 draw, with Municipal winning the final based on the away goals rule. Despite the loss, 

In the 2007 Clausura on 7 March 2007, Centurión scored the first goal of the match in a 3–1 victory against Deportivo Suchitepequez. Centurión played his last official match against Xelaju MC in a 2–1 win.

After a failure to reach an agreement between the respective clubs, Centurión left the club with a good image for his performance in the Torneo Apertura 2006 and Clausura 2007.

Club Guaraní 

After his time in Guatemalan soccer, Centurión returned to Paraguay to rejoin Club Guarani in July 2007.

There he played the Torneo Clausura 2007 and Torneo Apertura 2008. On 13 April 2008 during the Apertura, Centurión scored his third goal as a professional and second with Club Guarani, in a 2–2 draw against Sportivo Luqueño. Having secured his place in the starting 11, Centurión was pursued by several interested clubs. After the Apertura 2008 concluded, C.S.D. Municipal reached an agreement with Club Guarani and Centurión for a one-year loan with an option to purchase. With the transfer, Centurión became one of the few foreigners to play for both clubs. His last match with Guarani occurred against Club Nacional on 29 June 2008.

CSD Municipal

2008 season 

On 26 July 2008, Centurión made his official debut with C.S.D. Municipal, where the team faced Deportivo Xinabajul away from home and lost 2–1.

After placing second in the Torneo Apertura 2008, Municipal achieved direct qualification to represent the country in the 2008–09 CONCACAF Champions League. On 17 September 2008 in Torreón, Mexico, the club made its debut in the contest against Santos Laguna. Santos won 3–2 in a match considered to be the best of the championship.

They went on to lose 2–1 against Tauro in Panama, draw 2–2 against both Puerto Rico Islanders and Tauro at home, win by a single goal at Puerto Rico, and draw the group winners Santos 4–4 after a dramatic last minute goal from Guillermo "El Pando" Ramírez.

The Reds finished last in the group stage, with one win, three draws, and two losses, and therefore did not continue in the championship.

In the league, the team eventually placed first in the regular season which allowed them to advance to the semi-final, where they would face Deportivo Xinabajul again.

In the first match on 10 December Municipal won 2–1 at Estadio Los Cuchumatanes, and in the second match on 14 December Municipal won again with the same score of 2–1, this time at home. Municipal won 4–2 on aggregate and would face its classic rival Comunicaciones FC in the finals.

The first match was played at home on 17 December, where Municipal lost 2–1. The second match was played at the Estadio Mateo Flores in 21 December. The match ended in a 1–1 draw, which meant the league title went to Comunicaciones with a 3–2 aggregate score, leaving Centurión and his team empty handed without a trophy.

2009 season 
Centurión began the 2009 Torneo Clausura by scoring a goal on 19 April 2009 against Heredia Jaguares at home, where the team won at home 2–1.  The team finished second in the regular season and advanced to the semi-finals, defeating Deportivo Suchitepequez 3–2 on aggregate with a great comeback after having lost the first leg 2–0. The Final would be played against Deportivo Jalapa, which resulted in a 4–1 loss on aggregate, again leaving Municipal empty-handed.

After failing to reach an agreement with Guarani, Centurión left the club where he contested the Torneo Apertura 2008, 2008–09 Champions League, and Torneo Clausura 2009, having been an important contributor to Municipal's efforts.

Centurión became one of the few foreign players who have played in the two top soccer teams of Guatemala and have played El Clásico with both teams.

Return to Club Guaraní 

In July 2009 Centurión returned to Club Guarani. He participated in the Clausura 2009 Tournament, where the club qualified for the 2010 Copa Sudamericana with a third place regular season finish.

In the 2010 Torneo Apertura, Club Guaraní won the league, giving Centurión his first title win. This title qualified Guaraní for the 2011 Copa Libertadores. Centurión scored one goal with the club, in a 5–2 victory against Tacuary on 17 February 2010.

River Plate Puerto Rico 

In September 2010, Club Atlético River Plate Puerto Rico announced their acquisition of Centurión. He played in the 2010 PRSL Season, becoming one of the team's best players and being named team captain. The team went on to win the Puerto Rico Soccer League championship, with the first match of the final against Puerto Rico Islanders, a 1–0 victory, taking place on Centurión's birthday.

In 2011, he played in the CFU Club Championship and the PRSL.

Sarmiento de Resistencia

2011–12 

On 2 August 2011, Centurión was signed by Torneo Argentino B club Sarmiento de Resistencia. He made his official debut for the club on 6 September 2011 in the Second Round of the Copa Argentina against San Martin of Formosa, where Sarmiento won 4–3 by way of penalties (0–0 draw after 90 minutes). Centurión, along with his team, advanced to the round of 16 after beating higher-division teams like second division club Gimnasia y Esgrima de Jujuy in the round of 64, and 2011–12 Primera División champion Arsenal de Sarandi in the round of 32. In the round of 16, Sarmiento faced eventual cup-runner up Racing de Avellaneda; The club lost the match 2–0 and was eliminated from the tournament, although with the best performance from a Torneo Argentino B club.

On 11 September 2011, Centurión officially debuted in the Torneo Argentino B facing Guaraní Antonio Franco with a 1–0 loss. The club finished fourth of 7 in the group standings and barely missed out on qualifying to the next phase based on head-to-head record with third-placed team San Martin de Formosa.

2012–13 
Unlike the previous tournament, Sarmiento came first out of 14 teams in the Group 4 standings and qualified to the next stage. However, in the next stage, Sarmiento finished last in a group made up of 4 teams and were eliminated. The player's last match with Sarmiento was in a 0–1 loss against General San Martin.

In the 2012–13 Copa Argentina, he played his first game against rivals Chaco For Ever where Sarmiento wins on penalties 4–3 (0–0 after 90 min.), moving on to the next stage to face Jorge Gibson Brown.
 The result was a 2–0 loss, which resulted in Sarmiento being eliminated.

After no agreement was made, Centurión decided to leave the club after the 2012–13 season in order to return to his hometown and keep playing the same category, giving priority to his family.

Sol de América Formosa 
After 11 years, Centurión returned to his native province and rejoined the club that saw him make his debut, Sol de América, for the 2013–14 Torneo Argentino B season.

He made his second debut with Sol de América on 22 September 2013 in Posadas, Misiones, against Asociación Ex Alumnos – 185th school.
Sol de América had a good performance in the aforementioned tournament, where they finished first in their zone that and ended second in their group in the second phase. They were eliminated in the third phase by Union Aconquija.

At the end of the season, Centurión left the club to continue his career as a player in Guatemalan football. His last match with Sol de América was against Club Fontana de Resistencia on 10 November 2013; Centurión's team won 3–0.

Antigua Guatemala 

After 4 ½ years, Centurion returns to Guatemalan football, to the club Antigua GFC. He made his debut on 26 January 2014 in a 0–0 draw against Coban Imperial.

On 23 February Centurión scored his first goal with the shirt of Antigua against Sacachispas; the match finished in a bulky 6–1 victory in favor of Antigua, and Centurión scored the second goal of the match shortly before halftime. His last official game was on 4 May against Deportivo Carchá. After 6 months Centurión left the Antigueñan club.

Deportivo Coatepeque 

Shortly after leaving Antigua, another Guatemalan Club, Deportivo Coatepeque show interest in him and negotiate an offer. The club and the player both came into agreement and he officially signed in October 2014.

The team was very committed to the topic of avoiding relegation since in those instances they occupied the last position in the standings. Beyond that Centurión always liked challenges and agreed to join with his other colleagues to try and fix the situation.

He debuted in a 1–0 loss against Comunicaciones on 18 October 2014.

As time passed he was starting to be considered a key player on and off the court; Therefore, on several occasions he wore the captain's armband, although he did not begin wearing it until the middle of Apertura tournament. At the end of that tournament, Paulo received several offers from other teams in the Guatemalan league. However, he gave priority to Coatepeque since he was committed to helping the team avoid relegation. Results were improving with Centurión in the squad, but other teams weren't dropping points, and eventually the team was relegated. His last match for the club was against Comunicaciones on 18 April 2015, which ended in a 4–0 loss.

Universidad San Carlos 

With the 2015–16 season already underway, he receives an offer from Universidad San Carlos and signs a six-month contract for the club on 6 October 2015 which includes a six-month extension to play the Clausura. 4 days later he officially makes his debut away to Cobán Imperial, being subbed in at the start of the second half of a 2–2 draw.

A week later, the club traveled to the Quetzaltenango Department where it faced Xelajú MC; Centurion was included in the starting 11, but they lost the match 1–0.

Centurion's last official match with the club was against his former team Antigua GFC, which ended in a 1–0 loss.

Deportivo Escuintla Heredia 

With the league tournament already underway, Centurión received an offer from Deportivo Escuintla Heredia from the Primera División de Ascenso. What most seduced Centurion to transfer to the club was the head coach; he was the same coach that introduced him to Guatemalan football a decade ago with Comunicaciones, and they developed an excellent friendship.

Closing Tournament 2016 

He debuted before the Social Club and Deportivo Nueva Concepción with the score in favor of 1 to 0. and in his second game facing Deportivo Chiantla with a score of 3 to 0, Centurión turned in the second goal that gave the advantage until that, then the party. In the penultimate date of the classification phase; Face the Santa Lucia Cotzumalguapa FC where they win by the score of 1 to 0 with goal of Centurión in the minute 58, second both from its arrival to the equipment.

The championship was still under way; And the team escuintleto tried to obtain the classification in the fight of the title (already had been adjudged champion of the opening match) of not to obtain it would have 2 opportunities of ascent: the first one is playing a finalísima between champions of the opening and closing; And the second in a duel of repechaje with the last one placed in the table of accumulated of the Greater League. Unfortunately he can not classify; What remains is to wait for the new champion (tournament closure) to dispute the finalísima for the promotion; The rival Social Club and Deportivo Carchá (Champion of the match Clausura). The game is played in neutral field; The Pensational Stadium headquarters where former GFC does of local serious redoubt of game, On 22 May at 11 a. M. Is disputed the encounter where the escuintleco set ties 2 to 2 in the 90 minutes plus 30 of lengthening so the final is defined as a penalty shootout; Luck does not accompany the green set so they lose by 5 to 4. So he would fight the second chance to ascend facing the Deportivo Malacateco; Set that came out last in the accumulated Major League. The repechaje would be given in 2 games (round and round), Saturday 28 May in the night of the city of Escuintla is the first game where the local team falls by 2 to 1, leaving open the series to undefined by the time; Since the green set can reverse the marker but this time in visitor condition. The second match (second leg) takes place at the Santa Lucia Stadium; the venue where the Deportivo Malacateco plays host, on Sunday, 5 June at 12:00 noon, the schedule of the match is agreed where the locals win the match by 4 to 2; staying in Liga Mayor Malacateco, and where the Escuintlecos fail to realize the longed for promotion to the highest category of Guatemalan football.

Opening Tournament - Closing 2016/2017 

After the conclusion of the Opening and Closing of the 2015–2016 Season. Paulo Centurion reached the agreement with the club board to play 1 year more the 2016–2017 Season. Start the Apertura with a victory of 1 to 0 as a visitor to Santa Lucia Cotzumalguapa FC, good start for the pretensions of qualifying to enter the dispute of the phase for the title fight and thus have a key to the ascent to which they had escaped, thus leaving the spine stuck for not having succeeded. They finish the regular phase obtaining the classification adjudicating the key of quarters of end, the rival of serious shifts Deportivo Mixco in games of round trip.
 The first match was played at Armando Barillas Stadium (Escuintla) on 17 November 2016; At 6:00 pm. With a victory of the group escuintleca by 1 to 0. Everything would be defined in the match of return in the Stadium Cementos Progreso]; Resinto where the picture of Mixco does of local, the encounter is disputed 20 November to the 12,00 hs. With a score of 1 to 0 in favor of the locals equaling the series, in the overtime both teams gave everything but failed to make a difference which everything would be defined in the penalty shootings. Unfortunately the set Escuintleca loses by that way by a 5–4 against; Centurion Together with his other teammates start a new tournament with the mentality set to achieve the first objective is to qualify to get into the keys to fight for the title and later To achieve the long-awaited ascent from which they had slipped out of their hands the previous year. The first encounter they do in a condition of visitor in front of Deportivo Iztapa getting the victory, good start for the whole Escuintleto, but ahead, the road would be complicated, such is the case that it is not possible to classify staying in the I walk all the dreams and goals to which they had been drawn, once again empty-handed. As Soccer has those things, which is not known to be waiting around the corner, Paulo Centurion would leave the club leaving a good image, and the recognition and respect on the part of the people Who knew how to appreciate and see the effort made in each game played wearing green colors.

Return to Comunicaciones 

After 11 years, Centurión returned to Comunicaciones FC, which he left after the 2006–07 season concluded. He was signed to a one-year contract.

Apertura Tournament - Closing 2017/2018 

They began the tournament in local conditions debuting against Universidad SC with a 1–0 loss, which was a bad start, and that bad run would stay with the club, because the whole Apertura tournament turned out to be quite difficult. Bad fortune rocked the team, even though the team played well, they still struggled to score goals; and as a result they finished last in the league table. The permanence in the top category was complicated; and for the Closing Tournament they had to fix the situation by achieving the first place to secure the category. Although many did not have faith in the team, the group of players and coaching staff manage to improve the situation in the  Clausura Tournament where they eventually managed to finish in first place, securing their permanence in the top category and achieving the classification by the relegation playoff with 1 matchday left.
In the final instances they faced Santa Lucía Cotzumalguapa FC, playing the first leg Away from home; the result was a 3–1 loss, and The return meeting was played in the Cementos Progreso; Comunicaciones overturned the result by winning 2-0 (3-3 on aggregate, Comunicaciones qualified on away goals) and made it to the semifinal, at the same time getting closer to their goal of winning the championship. By the format of the League of the First Division, Comunicaciones won the right for a two legged playoff for the direct promotion, and for this Deportivo Chiantla would be their opponent, and by positions in their respective groups, Comunicaciones would be the home side in the first leg. Comunicaciones lost 2-1 and hope for becoming championship winners was diminishing. The return leg was played in the Estádio Buenos Aires where Chiantla were at home. Chiantla won 2–0; and Municipal were eliminated in the semifinal phase.

Opening Tournament - Closing 2018/2019 

For the next season, the Club renewed Centurión's contract for one more year to continue with the originally planned objective. The objective was to repeat or improve what was done in the previous league tournament, and doing well in the Cup as well. The league debut was against CSD Carchá in a 0–0 draw at home.
Centurión met the goal net on the fourth matchdate against Deportivo Sansare, opening the scoring to 1–0, with a final result 2–0. Everything was going well, and he scored again in the next game in a 5–1 victory away to Universidad SC. Overall it was a difficult tournament for the club who achieves the first goal of qualifying to the finals In fourth place. In the quarterfinals they faced Santa Lucia Cotzumalguapa FC, on 28 November at Cementos Progreso the first game is played with a score of 1–1, leaving the key open for the return game. On 2 December the return leg is played with Santa Lucia as the local team. Santa Lucia beat them 3–1, and once more they were eliminated.

Honors

Club Guaraní 
 Paraguayan Primera División: Apertura 2010

Club Atlético River Plate Puerto Rico 
 Puerto Rico Soccer League: 2010

References

External links
 Profile at BDFA
 Profile at Ceroacero

1982 births
Living people
Argentine footballers
Association football defenders
Antigua GFC players
C.S.D. Municipal players
Club Atlético River Plate Puerto Rico players
Club Guaraní players
Comunicaciones F.C. players
Deportivo Coatepeque players
Juventud Escuintleca players
People from Formosa, Argentina
Sarmiento de Resistencia footballers
Sol de América de Formosa players
Universidad de San Carlos players